Oklahoma (SSN-802) will be a  nuclear powered attack submarine in the United States Navy. She is to be the second vessel named for the state of Oklahoma, and the first to carry the name since the loss of the battleship  during the attack on Pearl Harbor, which lead to the US involvement in World War II. Acting Secretary of the Navy Thomas Modly announced the name on 24 December 2019, in a press release. Oklahoma, first of the Virginia-class Block V boats, was authorized for construction on 2 December 2019.

References

Sources
Naval Vessel Register – OKLAHOMA (SSN 802)

Virginia-class submarines
Submarines of the United States Navy
Proposed ships of the United States Navy